Eros Vlahos (born 13 January 1995) is an English actor and comedian. He is known for his roles as Cyril Gray in Nanny McPhee and the Big Bang, Jake Farley in Summer in Transylvania, and Lommy Greenhands in Game of Thrones. He also appeared in a recurring role on the television series Da Vinci's Demons, as Nico Machiavelli.

Family background and personal life
Eros Vlahos was born in London on 13 January 1995.  His parents are Terry Davy (mother) and Spiros Vlahos (father), and he has a younger brother, Tron Vlahos. He is of British (maternal) and Greek (paternal) ancestry.

Vlahos' parents also work in commercial partnership with one another; his mother as a fashion designer and his father as business manager.  They own and operate the original Cyberdog shop in Camden Market; a futurist and rave-scene fashion, accessory, and toy retailer which they founded together in 1994.

Career

Filmography

Other
In the summer of 2008, at the age of 13, Vlahos wrote and performed his own material at the Edinburgh Festival Fringe. In December of that year, he was recruited to review Christmas pantomimes for the Guardian newspaper and website. He also had a comedy show on Radio London and has appeared on CBBC Extra. He has been involved with the "Comedy Club 4 Kids UK" children's Comedy Academy.

References

External links
 Eros Vlahos' official website

1995 births
Living people
21st-century English male actors
English male child actors
English male comedians
English male film actors
English male television actors
English people of Greek descent
Male actors from London